Sudley may refer to a location or building:

United States
 Sudley (Deale, Maryland), a historic home listed on the NRHP in Anne Arundel County, Maryland
 Sudley, Maryland, an unincorporated community
 Sudley Place, a historic mansion in Tennessee
 Sudley Springs, Virginia, an unincorporated community
 Sudley, Virginia, a census-designated place

United Kingdom
 Sudeley Castle, a castle in Gloucestershire, England
 Sudley House, a historic house in Liverpool, England